Picnic, also known as Hurrah, is an unincorporated community in southeastern Hillsborough County, Florida,  United States, between Plant City and Lithia near the intersection of Carter Road and Florida State Road 39. It is best known as the home of Alafia River State Park.

History
Picnic and Hurrah started as separate communities, shortly after the civil war. It draws its name from a popular gathering place at the junction of the Alafia River and Hurrah Creek.

Education
The community of Picnic is served by Hillsborough County Schools. Students are zoned for Pinecrest Elementary, Turkey Creek Middle School and Durant High School.

References

Unincorporated communities in Hillsborough County, Florida
Unincorporated communities in Florida